Daniel Schnider (born 20 November 1973) is a Swiss former professional road cyclist. He was the Swiss National Road Race champion in 2003.

Major results

1996
 3rd National Hill Climb Championships
1997
 1st Melbourne to Warrnambool Classic
1998
 2nd Overall Circuito Montañés
 3rd Overall Tour du Vaucluse
 6th Overall GP Tell
 9th Japan Cup Cycle Road Race
 10th Overall Tour de Normandie
1999
 2nd Road race, National Road Championships
 2nd Wartenberg Rundfahrt
 3rd National Hill Climb Championships
2000
 1st  Overall À travers Lausanne
1st Stage 2a
 1st  National Hill Climb Championships
2001
 2nd Overall Circuit de Lorraine
1st Stage 6
 1st Six Days of Zurich (with Scott McGrory and Matthew Gilmore)
 3rd Road race, National Road Championships
 3rd GP Winterthur
 4th GP du canton d'Argovie
 7th Gran Premio di Lugano
 10th Overall Tour de Suisse
2003
 1st  Road race, National Road Championships
 3rd Overall Sachsen Tour
 3rd Schynberg Rundfahrt
 9th Overall Tour du Poitou Charentes
2004
 8th Tour de Berne
2005
 6th Overall Tour de Wallonie

Grand Tour general classification results timeline

References

External links

1973 births
Living people
Swiss male cyclists
Sportspeople from the canton of Lucerne